Jacky Alders (born 28 January 1956) is a Belgian sprint canoer who competed in the late 1970s and early 1980s. He was eliminated in the semifinals of the K-4 1000 m event at the 1976 Summer Olympics in Montreal.  Four years later in Moscow, Alders was eliminated in the repechages of the K-2 500 m event.

References 
 Sports-Reference.com profile

1956 births
Belgian male canoeists
Canoeists at the 1976 Summer Olympics
Canoeists at the 1980 Summer Olympics
Living people
Olympic canoeists of Belgium